The Spearman Experiment was an Australian television series, hosted by Magda Szubanski that counts down Australian pop culture's most defining people and topics based on a public poll commented on by various Australian celebrities. The show is named for Charles Spearman, who developed Spearman's rank correlation coefficient, the statistical technique used to survey the public to produce the show's rankings. It premiered on 8 September 2009.

The series began development in May 2009, and was officially announced in early August 2009. The show was ultimately cancelled due to low ratings.

Format 
The host and guest celebrities analyse, critique and celebrate Australia's most popular topics interspersed with film clips. The show has been compared to clip show 20 to 1 which aired on Channel 9. However, The Spearman Experiment only counts down the top 15, rather than the top 20. Channel Ten also advertises the fact that The Spearman Experiments results are chosen by the public rather than television executives, as is the case with 20 to 1.

EpisodesEpisode 1: Aussie Comedy Characters - 8 September 2009Episode 2: Awesome Underdogs - 15 September 2009Episode 3: Cashed-up Bogans - 22 September 2009Episode 4: Songs You Should Never Have on Your iPod - 29 September 2009
Episode 5: Catchphrases - 6 October 2009Episode 6: Weird True Freaky - 16 October 2009Episode 7: Animated Characters - 23 October 2009Episode 8:''' Shocking Reality TV Moments - 30 October 2009Contributors

 Angela Bishop
 Anh Do
 Anthony Maroon
 Bill Woods
 Brad McEwan
 Carson Kressley
 Charli Robinson
 Ciel Stowe
 Claire Hooper
 Colin Lane
 Chris Brown
 Chrissie Swan
 Dave Hughes
 Dave O'Neil
 Erin McNaught
 Fuzzy Agolley
 Heath Franklin as "Chopper"
 Holly Brisley
 Ian 'Dicko' Dickson
 James Kerley
 Jason Coleman
 Jonathan Pease
 Charlotte Dawson

 Kim Watkins
 Marcia Hines
 Matt Lee
 Maz Compton
 Merrick Watts
 Michelle Bridges
 Mike Goldman
 Mikey Robins
 Natalie Bassingthwaighte
 Natalie Hunter
 Natarsha Belling
 Nikki Osborne
 Paul Mercurio
 Peter Helliar
 Samuel Johnson
 Sandra Sully
 Sara-Marie
 Sarah Wilson
 Shannan Ponton
 Tim Ross
 Tom Gleeson
 Zoe Naylor

RatingsThe Spearman Experiment drew 1.039 million viewers nationally for its premiere episode making it the 11th most viewed program of the day. The show's second week showed a massive decline in audience, with national ratings dropping to 699,000 viewers, coming fourth in its timeslot. In its third week ratings grew to 808,000, coming third in its timeslot.  The fourth week, it dropped to 668,000 which made it the 17th most watched program that evening. On 16 October 2009, the show was moved to a Friday night timeslot of 7:30pm, to make way for new episodes of The Simpsons'' on Tuesday night.

See also
 20 to 1
 List of Australian television series

References

Network 10 original programming
2009 Australian television series debuts
2009 Australian television series endings